Richard Lee Bass (March 15, 1937 – February 1, 2006) was an American football running back from who played for the Los Angeles Rams of the National Football League (NFL) from 1960 to 1969.

Early life and education
Born in Georgetown, Mississippi in 1937, Bass moved as a youth with his family in the Great Migration to California, where they settled in Vallejo. He had a brother, professional athlete Norm Bass and a sister, Dorothy. Many migrants from the South were attracted to the jobs in defense-related industries and other opportunities.

Bass played football and other varsity sports for Vallejo High School in the old North Bay League. Bass blossomed as a three-sport star at Vallejo High, where he ran for 3,690 yards and scored 68 touchdowns in 18 games. Bass scored a state-record 37 touchdowns in 1954, when he led the Apaches to an undefeated season at 9-0. The team averaged 54 points per game in 1954.

Bass went on to star at College of the Pacific, now University of the Pacific. Time magazine described him as a "One-Man Show" in 1958, after he ran for 700 yards in six games to become the season's leading NCAA ground gainer, while passing for the Tigers as well.  He was a 1958 All-American. As a senior in 1958, Bass led the nation in rushing with 1,361 yards, including a dazzling display in the season opener in Berkeley, where he gained 215 yards and scored one touchdown in the Tigers' win over a Cal team that would reach the 1959 Rose Bowl. Bass was named to The Pigskin Club of Washington, D.C. National Intercollegiate All-American Football Players Honor Roll.

Professional career
After being taken by the Rams as the second pick in the 1959 NFL draft, Bass was selected for the Pro Bowl three times, in 1962, 1963, and 1966. He rushed for 1,000 yards in a season two times (1962 and 1966). He finished his career with the Rams in 1969 with 5,417 yards rushing, the most among active players.

Following his retirement, he did some work with the NFL alumni association. He also made appearances in TV commercials. He worked as a color analyst on Rams radio broadcasts from 1977 to 1986. He also worked as executive director of the Greater Norwalk Chamber of Commerce (1990-2004). He died at his home at age 68 in Norwalk, California.

Kody Scott, alias Sanyika Shakur, a Los Angeles gang member known as "Monster" reported in his 1998 autobiography that his mother had identified Bass as his father.

Legacy and honors
 1983 – Inducted as a Charter Member of the Pacific Athletics Hall of Fame.
 2005 – Inducted into the Bay Area Sports Hall of Fame.
 May 25, 2012 – Vallejo High School football practice field was officially dedicated as "Dick Bass Field".
 No. 22 retired by Pacific Tigers.

See also
 List of NCAA major college football yearly rushing leaders
 List of NCAA major college football yearly scoring leaders
 List of NCAA major college football yearly total offense leaders

Notes

Further reading

External links

1937 births
2006 deaths
American football running backs
Los Angeles Rams announcers
Los Angeles Rams players
National Football League announcers
Pacific Tigers football players
Players of American football from California
Sportspeople from Vallejo, California
Western Conference Pro Bowl players
People from Copiah County, Mississippi